The Whole Truth is a 1923 American film starring Stan Laurel.

Cast
 Stan Laurel as The husband
 James Finlayson as Defense lawyer
 Earl Mohan as Florist
 Helen Gilmore as The wife
 Jack Ackroyd as Clerk
 Wallace Howe as Chemist
 Charles Stevenson as Jewish tailor

See also
 List of American films of 1923

References

External links

The Whole Truth at SilentEra

1923 films
Silent American comedy films
American silent short films
American black-and-white films
1923 comedy films
1923 short films
Films directed by Ralph Ceder
American comedy short films
1920s American films